

Malan retires
The Prime Minister announced his retirement, to a "dumbfounded" cabinet on 12 October 1954 – it was thought to be linked to his health. The party favourite, E.H. Louw, was suggested by Die Burger to take over. But in the ensuing months, a race broke out between N.C. Havenga and Hans Strydom – who wanted to accelerate the "nationalist objectives".

On 30 November 1954, Hans Strydom was announced as D.F. Malan's successor.

Cabinet

Citations

Sources

Government of South Africa
Executive branch of the government of South Africa
Cabinets of South Africa
1953 establishments in South Africa
1954 disestablishments in South Africa
Cabinets established in 1953
Cabinets disestablished in 1958